Shahabad (also Romanized as Shāhābād; also known as Vaḩdatābād) is a village in Najafabad Rural District, in the Central District of Sirjan County, Kerman Province, Iran. At the 2006 census, its population was 380, in 85 families.

References 

Populated places in Sirjan County